Joseph Sweid (born 1958) has been Syrian Minister of State since 2011 and a member of the Syrian Social Nationalist Party. He has served as the Minister of Expatriates.

Sweid was born in Damascus in 1958. He earned his LLB degree at the University of Damascus in 1983, afterwards practicing law.

Sweid became a member of the People's Assembly in 2003, serving on the Committees of Foreign Affairs. He was also Constitutional
Secretary of the Political Bureau of the Syrian Social Nationalist Party. He is married and has two children.

See also
Cabinet of Syria

References

Minister of State Joseph Suwaid, SANA
Biography of the new Syrian government 2011 - the names and lives of government ministers, Syria FM, 17 April 2011

1958 births
People from Damascus
Living people
Syrian Social Nationalist Party politicians
Damascus University alumni
Syrian ministers of state